Tudor Gheorghe (born August 1, 1945) is a Romanian musician, actor, and poet known primarily for his politically charged musical career and his collaborations with well-known figures of late 20th-century Romanian poetry. His recording work is sometimes associated with anti communist activism and has received much critical acclaim during the years. The son of an Iron Guard member, he was banned from performing and recording in 1987 after a concert at Sala Palatului in Bucharest, following a number of run-ins with Romania's communist authorities throughout the 1970s and 1980s.

Biography
Born in Podari, Dolj County, Tudor Gheorghe started his secondary studies at the Frații Buzești High School in Craiova. Expelled for political reasons in 9th grade, he moved to stay with some aunts in Arad, attending the city's Moise Nicoară High School. The following year he returned to Craiova, where he studied at the Carol I High School, from which he graduated in due course. He then studied to be an actor, graduating from the I.L. Caragiale Institute of Theatre and Film Arts in Bucharest in 1966. He later started composing music as a means of expressing his interest in Romanian poetry. His first national tour in 1969 was critically and commercially acclaimed and established him as a figure of the fledgling contemporary folk scene in Romania. His recording career, spanning fifty years, has frequently defied pop music conventions while exploring various traditions in Romanian music, from folk, religious music, the anti-communist anthems of Jean Moscopol to popular music of interwar Romania, at times embracing even children's or classical music. Throughout his early career, he performed with a guitar or lute with no backing musicians or vocalists but, starting in the early 2000s, he has incorporated orchestras, choirs, and tarafs into his performances. He resumed his musical career in 1992 but, dissatisfied with the way promoters wanted to market his music, took another six-year break from performing live. He has been touring constantly since 1998 and has recorded most of his concerts, releasing them as albums and generally avoiding studio work.

Throughout his career, he has been praised as a performer and songwriter by a number of Romanian literary figures. The poet and playwright Marin Sorescu addressed his personal relationship with Gheorghe in 1988 by saying that "Every time I listen to his music [...] Tudor Gheorghe reinforces my hunch that Romanian poetry [...] can move mountains", while Adrian Păunescu described him as "a great poet who negletcs his talent". In an article published in the Flacăra magazine in 1973, Dorin Tudoran chronicled Gheorghe's precarious living conditions at the time, characterizing him as "a great artist, who has abundantly proved to be perfectly aware of his obligations".

The University of Craiova and the Constantin Brâncuși University of Târgu Jiu have awarded him doctor honoris causa titles for his contributions to Romanian music and culture and both Romania and the Republic of Moldova have decorated him with the Order of the Star of Romania and the Order of the Republic, respectively. In a 2006 poll conducted by Romanian Television to identify the "100 greatest Romanians of all time", he came in 76th.

Discography

Studio albums

Starting in the late 1990s, Tudor Gheorghe has performed almost exclusively in live concerts, recording and releasing them as albums.

Live albums

References

Footnotes

Sources

1945 births
Living people
People from Dolj County
Romanian male singers
Romanian folk singers
Carol I National College alumni
Caragiale National University of Theatre and Film alumni
Knights of the Order of the Star of Romania
Recipients of the Order of the Republic (Moldova)